The Meek Shall Inherit What's Left is the second album by Kiss Kiss, released on July 7, 2009 on Eyeball Records.

Track listing
 "The Best Mistake" (2:53)
 "Plague #11" (2:24)
 "Haunted By The Beauty Of An Imperfection" (0:35)
 "All They Draw" (2:56)
 "Innocent I (The Corruption Of Self Through The Introduction Of Naturally Existing Self Producing Chemicals)" (2:22)
 "Innocent II (A Drop From The Ethereal; Swimming Towards The Crescent Moon)" (3:31)
 "IIIIIIIIIIII" (2:22)
 "Hate" (4:04)
 "Through The Day" (2:58)
 "If They Only Knew" (4:59)
 "Virus" (15:56)

References

Kiss Kiss (band) albums
2007 albums